Kyambogo University (KYU) is a public university in Uganda. It is one of the eight public universities and degree-awarding institutions in the country with the motto, "Knowledge and Skills for Service."

History
Kyambogo University was established in 2003 by the Universities and Other Tertiary Institutions Act 2001 by merging Uganda Polytechnic Kyambogo (UPK), the Institute of Teacher Education, Kyambogo (ITEK), and the Uganda National Institute of Special Education (UNISE).

Uganda Polytechnic Kyambogo
In 1928 the trade and technical courses at Makerere College (now Makerere University) were split off into the new Kampala Technical School. The school moved to Nakawa and became the Kampala Technical Institute. In 1958 that school was moved to Kyambogo renamed Uganda Technical College and then was finally renamed Uganda Polytechnic, Kyambogo.

Institute of Teacher Education, Kyambogo
ITEK started as a government teacher training college in 1948 at Nyakasura, Kabarole District. In 1954, it transferred to Kyambogo Hill as a national teachers’ college and later became ITEK by statute of parliament in 1989.

Uganda National Institute of Special Education
UNISE was affiliated to the Department of Special Education at the faculty of education of Makerere University, becoming an autonomous institution by Act of Parliament in 1998.

Campus
The geographical coordinates of the university campus are:
0°21'00.0"N, 32°37'48.0"E (Latitude:0.350000; Longitude:32.630000).

Organization and administration
Kyambogo University now has six faculties, six schools and one institute:

 Faculty of Engineering
 Faculty of Science
 Faculty of Agriculture
 Faculty of Special Needs & Rehabilitation
 Faculty of Arts and Humanities
 Faculty of Social Sciences
 School of Built Environment
 School of Vocational Studies
 School of Computing and Information Science
 School of Education
 School of Art and Industrial Design
 School of Management and Entrepreneurship
 Institute of Distance Education, E-Learning and Learning Centres.

Notable academics
 John Ssebuwufu - Chemist, academic, and academic administrator. Chancellor of Kyambogo University since 19 February 2014.
 Elly Katunguka - Veterinarian, academic, and academic administrator - Vice chancellor of Kyambogo University since 13 February 2014.

Notable alumni

Royals
William Gabula, 4th Kyabazinga of Busoga and Paramount Chief of Gabula

Politics
 Henry Bagiire, Minister of State for Agriculture, 2011-2016
 Charles Bakkabulindi, MP, Minister of State for Sports since 2005
 Rukiya Chekamondo, Minister of State for Privatisation, 2006-2011
 Lukia Isanga Nakadama, Minister of State for Gender and Culture since 2006
 Daniel Kidega, 4th Speaker of the East African Legislative Assembly since 2014
 Brenda Nabukenya, Member of parliament seat for Luwero district in between 2011 and 2016, Luwero district Women Member of Parliament 2021-

Academics
Hannington Sengendo, Vice Chancellor of Nkumba University since 2013.
Arthur Sserwanga, Vice Chancellor of Muteesa I Royal University 2014 to 2017.

Business
Anatoli Kamugisha, founder and managing director of Akright Projects
Richard Musani, marketing manager, Movit Products Limited

Entertainment
Joanita Kawalya, musician and member of the Afrigo Band
Rachael Magoola, musician and member of the Afrigo Band
Irene Ntale, musician
Milka Irene, actress and politician
Rema Namakula, recording artist and entertainer

Sports
Stella Chesang, athlete and 2015 World Mountain Running Champion
Henry Malinga, basketball player
Brian Umony, footballer with KCCA FC and the Uganda national football team, known as the Uganda Cranes.

Others 
Diana Nkesiga, Vicar of All Saints' Cathedral, Nakasero since 2007
Julius Ocwinyo, poet and novelist

Notable faculty
John Ssebuwufu, Chancellor since 2014
Elly Katunguka, Vice Chancellor since 2014
Senteza Kajubi, Principal of the Kyambogo Institute of Higher Education, 1986-1990 
Venansius Baryamureeba, Assistant Lecturer, 1995-1996
Edward Rugumayo, Lecturer, 1968-1969
Sam Joseph Ntiro
Elvania Namukwaya Zirimu

See also
 List of universities in Uganda
 List of university leaders in Uganda

References

External links
 Kyambogo University website

 
2003 establishments in Uganda
Educational institutions established in 2003
Public universities
Education in Kampala
Nakawa Division
Engineering universities and colleges in Uganda